The Banjo, Mandolin and Guitar (BMG) movement is a music genre based on the family of fretted stringed instruments played with a plectrum or fingers, with or without fingerpicks.  The instruments include the banjo, mandolin and guitar.  This became popular in the US in the late 19th century and into the 20th century.  It fell from favour in the 1930s but there is still an organised movement in the UK where the BMG, founded in 1903, is the country's oldest music periodical still publishing. In the United States, a major magazine for the movement was The Cadenza magazine, published by Clarence L. Partee.

Images

References

Citations

Sources

Music genres